The Football Supporters' Federation (FSF) is an organisation representing football fans in England and Wales. It campaigns across a range of issues and supports fan representation on clubs' boards, lower ticket prices, and the introduction of safe standing areas at grounds in the top two tiers of English football. The organisation is free to join and acts as a singular voice for football fans.

The FSF represents more than 500,000 members made up of individual fans and affiliated supporters' organisations from every club in the professional game and footballing pyramid.

Founding 
The FSF was founded in 2002 after the amalgamation of two separate bodies, the Football Supporters' Association (FSA) and the National Federation of Supporters' Clubs (NATFED). The FSF is a democratically structured organisation with a National Council made up of elected individuals, officers and divisional representatives. The FSF's current chair is Malcolm Clarke, who also sits as the supporters' representative on The Football Association (FA)'s Council.

Functions 
The Federation has regular meetings with the football authorities and the Department for Culture, Media and Sport, discussing a wide range of issues, many of them placed on the agenda by the FSF to take forward their policies or in response to concerns raised by supporters. The FSF also has detailed meetings on specific topics with the relevant authorities or other bodies such as the Premier League, FA, Football League, Professional Footballers' Association, Independent Football Ombudsman and the Police Match Commanders. They also meet with government and the All-party parliamentary group on football of MPs when necessary.

The organisation regularly takes up specific complaints and cases which are raised with it by individual members or affiliated organisations and they encourage the participation of all supporters in this process. The FSF is free to join and holds an annual conference called Fans' Parliament where members can make their views known. At the 2010 Fans' Parliament, a national policy was adopted to oppose parts of the Football (Disorder) Act 2000 which was introduced by the Government to prevent certain football supporters from attending matches and travelling overseas, by imposing Football Banning Orders.

In the August 2010 issue No.22 of The Football Supporter - an FSF publication - the FSF Chairman explained why they took this stance whilst maintaining that the organisation is totally opposed to any form of football violence. "We have major concerns about the use of the so-called Section 14(b) provisions (also known as Football Banning Orders or FBOs) for gaining civil banning orders against football fans. These cases are heard in a civil not criminal court which means that there’s no jury, the burden of proof is lower and the police can introduce evidence of previous convictions which need not even be in a football context".

The organisation also helps promote the work of its affiliated supporters' organisations and has supported the Internet Football Association's annual tournament WorldNET since 2009 and has provided a free programme for all participants and spectators of that tournament.

In 2017, a unanimous motion to promote boycotts of The Sun, proposed by Spirit of Shankly and supported by all 20 Premier League clubs and around 50 other football teams passed at the organisation's annual summit. The boycott is in response to the newspaper's false claims in the days after the Hillsborough disaster and its response since, and followed a 2016 inquest around the incident.

FSF Player of the Year Award 
The Football Supporters' Federation Player of the Year is an annual award, presented at the FSF Awards ceremony in association with William Hill, given to the player who is adjudged to have had the best year in all of the divisions of Welsh and English football. The award has been presented since 2013, when the inaugural winner was Liverpool striker Luis Suárez. Winners are selected by public vote following a nominations process.

The table indicates where the winning player also won one or more of the other major "player of the year" awards in English football, namely the Professional Footballers' Association's Players' Player of the Year award (PPY), the Football Writers' Association's Footballer of the Year award (FWA), the PFA Fans' Player of the Year award (FPY), the Premier League Player of the Season award (PPS), and the PFA Young Player of the Year award (YPY).

See also 

Football in the United Kingdom
Football Supporters Europe
Football Supporters' Association

References

External links
 
 The Flickr account of the FSF

Football organisations in England
English football supporters' associations
H
Football organisations in Wales
Organisations based in Tyne and Wear
Sport in the City of Sunderland